The Metropolis of Kitros, Katerini, and Platamon is an Eastern Orthodox metropolis of the Church of Constantinople, but is de facto is administered (by agreement) for practical reasons as part of the Church of Greece. 

The bishopric is centered on the ancient town of Pydna, on the coast of Thessaly although named for the nearby villages of Kitros, and Katerini. Confusingly the village of Platamon is today in the Metropolis of Larissa and Tyrnavos.

History
The see is ancient and has a tradition of both Orthodox and Roman Catholic bishops.

The Kitros bishopric is mentioned in the Notitia Episcopatuum of Leo VI the Wise. Its bishop Germanus participated in the Council of Constantinople (879-880). after the Fourth Crusade Kitros became a Catholic diocese, as witnessed by a letter of Pope Innocent III in 1208, to an unnamed bishop of the see. It returned to Orthodox control soon after, when the region was conquered by the Despotate of Epirus.

Today the episcopal residence and two early Christian basilicas dating from the 4th and 6th centuries remain in nearby Pydna. Today there is a resident Orthodox bishop, while the see is also maintained by the Roman Catholic Church as a vacant titular see.

Known bishops
 Germanus participated in the Council of Constantinople (879-880)
 Panaretos, Bishop of Kitros, 996.
 Unnamed Catholic Bishop
 Unnamed Orthodox bishop in 1235
 Anonymous Orthodox bishop of Kitros
 John of Kitros
 Unnamed Bishop forced to flee slaughter of the inhabitants of Kitros in 1612.
 Nikolaos, 1840–1882 
 Theocletos.
 Parthenios Vardakas, 1904–1933.
 Konstantinos Koidakis, 1934–1954
 Barnabas (Nikolaos) Tzortzatos, 1954–1985 (in Greek)
 Agathonikos (Fatouros) of Kitros, 1985–2013 (in Greek)
 Georgios Chrysostomou, 2014– (in Greek)

Cathedral

The Cathedral is in nearby Katerini.

Monasteries
 Monastery of St. Dionysios in Olympos (For Men)
 Monastery of St. Efrem in Kontariotissa (For Women)
 Monastery of St. Athanasios (For Women)
 Monastery of the Virgin (Panagia) in Makrirachi (For Women)

References

Bibliography
 

Dioceses of the Church of Greece
Eastern Orthodox dioceses in Greece
Kitros
Pieria (regional unit)
Katerini